

1870s
 September 1873 Panic of 1873 -- By November 1873, 55 US railroads fail. (Another 60 are bankrupt by September 1874).

1910s
September 6, 1918:Canadian Northern Railway (nationalized)

1920s
July 12, 1920:Grand Trunk Pacific Railway (nationalized)
January 20, 1923:Grand Trunk Railway (nationalized)
 1925: Chicago, Milwaukee, and St. Paul Railway

1930s
December 4, 1931: Ann Arbor Railroad
February 10, 1932: Baltimore and Virginia Steamboat Company
March 31, 1933: Missouri Pacific Railroad
December 1934: Alleghany Corporation
 1935: Chicago, Milwaukee, St. Paul and Pacific Railroad
March 26, 1935: Copper Range Railroad
October 23, 1935: New York, New Haven and Hartford Railroad
October 31, 1935: Connecticut Company
November 29, 1935: New York, Westchester and Boston Railway
February 2, 1936: Van Sweringen Company
June 3, 1936: Old Colony Railroad
May 20, 1937: New York, Ontario and Western Railway
January 18, 1938: Erie Railroad
August 4, 1938: Boston and Providence Railroad
October 30, 1939: Central Railroad of New Jersey

1940s
 1947: American Railroad Company
March 2, 1949: Long Island Rail Road

1950s
November 19, 1954: Hudson and Manhattan Railroad

1960s
July 7, 1961: New York, New Haven and Hartford Railroad
September 7, 1962: Boston Terminal Corporation (South Station)
March 22, 1967: Central Railroad of New Jersey

1970s
March 12, 1970: Boston and Maine Corporation
June 21, 1970: Penn Central Transportation
July 24, 1970: Lehigh Valley Railroad
November 23, 1971: Reading Company
April 19, 1972: Lehigh and Hudson River Railway
June 26, 1972: Erie Lackawanna Railway
July 12, 1973: United New Jersey Railroad and Canal Company (Penn Central subsidiary)
July 14, 1973: Beech Creek Railroad; Cleveland, Cincinnati, Chicago and St. Louis Railway; Cleveland and Pittsburgh Railroad; Connecting Railway; Delaware Railroad; Erie and Pittsburgh Railroad; Michigan Central Railroad; Northern Central Railway; Penndel Company; Philadelphia and Trenton Railroad; Philadelphia, Baltimore and Washington Railroad; Pittsburgh, Fort Wayne and Chicago Railway; Pittsburgh, Youngstown and Ashtabula Railway; Union Railroad of Baltimore (Penn Central subsidiaries)
October 15, 1973: Ann Arbor Railroad
 December 19, 1977: Chicago, Milwaukee, St. Paul and Pacific Railroad

1980s
1987: Delaware and Hudson Railroad

References
PRR Chronology
RRHX - Railroad History Time Line

Bankruptcies
Bankruptcies, North America
Bankruptcies
Bankruptcies